Stoke-on-Trent City Council elections are held every four years. Stoke-on-Trent City Council is the local authority for the unitary authority of Stoke-on-Trent in the ceremonial county of Staffordshire, England. Since the last boundary changes in 2011, 44 councillors have been elected from 37 wards. New ward boundaries have been prepared to come into effect from the 2023 election.

Political control
From the federation of Stoke-on-Trent in 1910 until 1974, Stoke-on-Trent was a county borough, independent from any county council. The borough was awarded city status on 5 June 1925. Under the Local Government Act 1972 it became a non-metropolitan district, with Staffordshire County Council providing county-level services. The first election to the reconstituted city council was held in 1973, initially operating as a shadow authority before coming into its revised powers on 1 April 1974. The city became a unitary authority on 1 April 1997, regaining its independence from Staffordshire County Council. Political control of the council since 1910 has been held by the following parties:

County borough

Non-metropolitan district

Unitary authority

Leadership

The role of Lord Mayor of Stoke-on-Trent is largely ceremonial. Prior to 2002, political leadership was provided by the leader of the council. From 2002 to 2009, the city council had a directly elected mayor who acted as political leader. Since the abolition of the directly elected mayor position in 2009, leadership has again been provided by the leader of the council. The leaders since 1974 have been:

Leaders

Directly-elected mayors

Leaders

Council elections
1973 Stoke-on-Trent City Council election
1976 Stoke-on-Trent City Council election
1979 Stoke-on-Trent City Council election (New ward boundaries)
1980 Stoke-on-Trent City Council election
1982 Stoke-on-Trent City Council election
1983 Stoke-on-Trent City Council election
1984 Stoke-on-Trent City Council election
1986 Stoke-on-Trent City Council election
1987 Stoke-on-Trent City Council election
1988 Stoke-on-Trent City Council election
1990 Stoke-on-Trent City Council election
1991 Stoke-on-Trent City Council election
1992 Stoke-on-Trent City Council election
1994 Stoke-on-Trent City Council election
1995 Stoke-on-Trent City Council election
1996 Stoke-on-Trent City Council election
1998 Stoke-on-Trent City Council election
1999 Stoke-on-Trent City Council election
2000 Stoke-on-Trent City Council election
2002 Stoke-on-Trent City Council election (New ward boundaries)
2003 Stoke-on-Trent City Council election
2004 Stoke-on-Trent City Council election
2006 Stoke-on-Trent City Council election
2007 Stoke-on-Trent City Council election
2008 Stoke-on-Trent City Council election
2010 Stoke-on-Trent City Council election
2011 Stoke-on-Trent City Council election (New ward boundaries)
2015 Stoke-on-Trent City Council election
2019 Stoke-on-Trent City Council election

Mayoral elections
Stoke-on-Trent mayoral election, 2002
Stoke-on-Trent mayoral election, 2005

City result maps

By-election results

References

External links

 
Unitary authority elections in England
Council elections in Staffordshire